The Interlake Pharmacy Classic was an annual bonspiel, or curling tournament, that took place at the Stonewall Curling Club in Stonewall, Manitoba. The tournament was held in a modified double-knockout format. The tournament, started in 2004 as part of the World Curling Tour, was briefly excluded in 2009 but was re-added in 2010. Curlers from Manitoba have dominated the event.

Past champions

Men
Only skip's name is displayed.

Women
Only skip's name is displayed.

References

External links
Stonewall Curling Club Home

Former World Curling Tour events
Stonewall, Manitoba
Curling in Manitoba